Marrico Gafford (born May 23, 1996) is an American football wide receiver for the Birmingham Stallions of the United States Football League (USFL). He played college football at Wyoming.

Early life and high school
Gafford was born and grew up in Des Moines, Iowa. He originally attended East High School, where he played football and ran track and was named All-State at cornerback by The Des Moines Register. He transferred to Dowling Catholic High School going into his senior year and was again named All-State. He also competed in the Iowa High School Athletic Association track and field state championships, where he set the state's 100-meter dash record at 10.61 seconds and also won the Class 4A 200 meter dash title as well.

College career
Gafford began his collegiate career at Iowa Western Community College, where he played two seasons and totaled 77 tackles, five interceptions, and three fumble recoveries before committing to play at Wyoming for his final two seasons of college eligibility over offers from Troy and Ohio. In total, he accumulated  103 total tackles, six interceptions, 17 passes defended, three forced fumbles, and 1.5 tackles for loss over the course of his two seasons with the Cowboys. In his senior season, Gafford made 43 total tackles, a forced fumble, and a tackle for a loss with four interceptions and six pass deflections and was named second-team All-Mountain West Conference. His performance also earned him an invitation to participate in the 2018 NFLPA Collegiate Bowl.

Professional career

Tennessee Titans
Gafford signed with the Tennessee Titans as an undrafted free agent on April 28, 2018. He was cut by the team at the end of training camp on September 1, 2018.

Oakland / Las Vegas Raiders
Gafford was signed to the Oakland Raiders practice squad on September 3, 2018. While on the practice squad, the Raiders changed Gafford's primary position to wide receiver, in addition to his original cornerback position, due to his speed. He was promoted to the Raiders' active roster on December 18, 2018. Gafford made his NFL debut on December 24, 2018, in a 27-14 win against the Denver Broncos, playing on special teams.

On August 31, 2019, Gafford was waived by the Raiders during final roster cuts but was re-signed to the team's practice squad the next day. He was promoted to the active roster on November 27, 2019. Gafford caught a 49-yard touchdown pass from Derek Carr for his first career reception on December 8, 2019, against the Tennessee Titans. He finished the 2019 season with two catches for 66 yards and a touchdown in four games played.

On November 7, 2020, Gafford was waived by the Raiders and re-signed to the practice squad three days later.

Arizona Cardinals
Gafford signed a reserve/futures contract with the Arizona Cardinals on January 6, 2021. He was waived on August 23, 2021.

Buffalo Bills
On August 24, 2021, Gafford was claimed off waivers by the Buffalo Bills. He was waived on August 27.

Denver Broncos
On September 14, 2021, Gafford was signed to the Denver Broncos practice squad.

Green Bay Packers
On January 26, 2022, Gafford signed a reserve/future contract with the Green Bay Packers. The Packers moved Gafford back to cornerback after the team drafted three wide receivers in the 2022 NFL Draft. He was waived on August 30, 2022, and signed to the practice squad the next day. On September 2, 2022, he was released from the practice squad.

Birmingham Stallions
On December 13, 2022 Gafford signed with the Birmingham Stallions of the United States Football League (USFL) and returned to being a wide receiver.

Personal life
In 2021, Gafford married his Bosnian wife, Elma Šećerbegović. Their son was born in 2020, and their second son was born in December 2021.

References

External links
Wyoming Cowboys bio

1996 births
Living people
People from West Des Moines, Iowa
Players of American football from Iowa
American football cornerbacks
American football wide receivers
Iowa Western Reivers football players
Wyoming Cowboys football players
Tennessee Titans players
Oakland Raiders players
Las Vegas Raiders players
Arizona Cardinals players
Buffalo Bills players
Denver Broncos players
Green Bay Packers players
Birmingham Stallions (2022) players